Millán Millán is director of the Centro de Estudios Ambientales del Mediterráneo (CEAM) and is one of the main environmental assessors for the European Union.

Life
He graduated from University of Toronto with a BASc. in 1967, and MASc in 1969, and Ph.D. in Atmospheric Physics and Spectroscopy in 1972, and from School of Engineering, Bilbao with a Dr. Ing. Industrial Engineering in 1986.

He worked at Barringer Research Ltd in Toronto, specializing in design of instruments for geological exploration. While working there he designed electro-magnetic reels to measure nickel sulfide at a mine. This design, after the Munich terrorist attacks, was reworked for metal detectors, still used in airports today.

From 1967 on he worked designing electro-optical instruments to measure gases in industrial processes, and in 1968-1970 he designed COSPEC (Correlation SPECtrometer) to measure remote gases in the atmosphere.
This work was financed by NASA, and was used as his thesis in atmospheric physics. COSPEC was the first commercial instrument to measure remote atmospheric contaminants in movement in real time. It received many prizes and was given the IR-100 for ‘One of the best instrumental designs in 1970' by the Nobel Prize panel in Boston. COSPEC appears in the Encyclopædia Britannica, is currently used in more than 40 countries, and has more than 500 scientific references, including magazines such as SCIENCE and NATURE.

In 1972, Millán started working for the National Meteorological Center of Canada, responsible for contaminant dispersion in the atmosphere.
In 1973, he was asked by the European Commission Community to be the main adviser in environment and climate.
He studied and optimized the system of atmospheric dispersion and contaminant measuring of the Netherlands, Belgium, Germany and RDA. He co-organized six campaigns of atmospheric contaminants in Europe during 1974-1983.
Since 1974, he’s been named adviser “ad personam” of the European Community, choosing the science priorities of the 3rd, 4th, 5th and 6th Marco programs.

Millán was the first person to measure the dispersal of a contaminant plume more than 400 km in 1976. This was fundamental for society to consider, that atmospheric contamination isn’t limited by the small area where it may be produced, but affects, in different measure, all the planet.  It has also appeared in the movie ‘Dante's Peak’ and ‘Surviving St. Helen's’ by the BBC, as well as used in most Volcanic Studies.

Since 1991, he has been the director of the CEAM (Center of Environmental Studies of the Mediterranean) currently with 90 investigators at his charge. He is considered a specialist of the Mediterranean basin and the climate change in the Mediterranean coast.

He coordinates various I+D (Investigation and development)  programs in the European Community, from NATO / CCMS air pollution modeling to part of the board of directives of the European Science Foundation since 2003, etc. Is author of more than 96 scientific publications, has given numerous courses, master and seminars and has directed nine thesis. Millán Millán was named Doctor Honoris Causa by the University of Elche in 2009.

References

External links
 CEAM
http://farm4.static.flickr.com/3011/2783184717_822502caac_o.jpg
"Guest Post – Climate Change Predictions, Including Extreme Hydrometeorological Events By Dr. Millán Millán"
Climate change and torrential rains in Spain 15 January 2010

Living people
University of the Basque Country alumni
Year of birth missing (living people)
University of Toronto alumni
NASA people
Atmospheric physics